This is a list of 205 species in Scymnus, a genus of dusky lady beetles in the family Coccinellidae.

Scymnus species

 Scymnus abbreviatus LeConte, 1852 i c g
 Scymnus abietis (Paykull, 1798) g
 Scymnus alishanensis Pang & Yu, 1993 g
 Scymnus alpestris Mulsant & Rey, 1857 g
 Scymnus americanus Mulsant, 1850 i c g b  (American scymnus lady beetle)
 Scymnus angusticollis Fauvel, 1903 g
 Scymnus apetzi Mulsant, 1846 g
 Scymnus apicanus J. Chapin, 1973 i c g b  (apicanus lady beetle)
 Scymnus apiciflavus Motschulsky, 1858 i c g
 Scymnus apithanus Gordon, 1976 i c g
 Scymnus aquilonarius Gordon, 1976 i c g
 Scymnus araticus Iablokoff-Khnzorian, 1969 g
 Scymnus ardelio Horn, 1895 i c g b
 Scymnus aridoides Gordon, 1976 i c g
 Scymnus aridus Casey, 1899 i c g
 Scymnus ater Kugelann, 1794 g
 Scymnus auritus Thunberg, 1795 g
 Scymnus barberi Gordon, 1976 i c g
 Scymnus bifurcatus Yu, 1995 g
 Scymnus binotulatus Boheman, 1859 i c g
 Scymnus bistortus Yu, 1995 g
 Scymnus bivulnerus Capra & Fürsch, 1967 g
 Scymnus brullei Mulsant, 1850 i c g b  (Brullé's lady beetle)
 Scymnus bryanti Gordon, 1976 i c g
 Scymnus caffer Gordon, 1976 i c g
 Scymnus calaveras Casey, 1893 i c g b  (calaveras lady beetle)
 Scymnus canariensis Wollaston, 1864 g
 Scymnus caprai Canepari, 1983 g
 Scymnus carri Gordon, 1976 i c g
 Scymnus caudalis LeConte, 1850 i c g b  (caudal lady beetle)
 Scymnus caurinus Horn, 1895 i c g b  (northwestern lady beetle)
 Scymnus centralis Kamiya, 1965 g
 Scymnus cercyonoides Wollaston, 1864 g
 Scymnus cervicalis (Bate, 1888) i c g b
 Scymnus circumspectus  i c g b
 Scymnus cochereaui Bielawski, 1973 g
 Scymnus cockerelli Casey, 1899 i c g
 Scymnus compar (Anonymous [Bennett], 1830) i c g b
 Scymnus coniferarum Abbot & Smith, 1797 i c g b  (conifer lady beetle)
 Scymnus consobrinus LeConte, 1852 i c g b  (consobrinous lady beetle)
 Scymnus constrictus Mulsant, 1850 g
 Scymnus contemptus Weise, 1923 g
 Scymnus coosi Hatch, 1961 i c g
 Scymnus creperus Mulsant, 1850 i c g b
 Scymnus curvus Yang, 1978 g
 Scymnus damryi Weise, 1879 g
 Scymnus difficilis L. i c g b
 Scymnus dorcatomoides Weise, 1879 i c g
 Scymnus doriae Capra, 1924 g
 Scymnus doriai Capra, 1924 g
 Scymnus elusivus Gordon, 1976 i c g
 Scymnus enochrus (Fabricius, 1792) i c g b
 Scymnus epistemoides Wollaston, 1864 g
 Scymnus erythronotum Gordon, 1976 i c g
 Scymnus falli Mank, 1940 i c g b  (Fall's lady beetle)
 Scymnus fanjingicus Ren & Pang, 1995 g
 Scymnus femoralis (Gyllenhal, 1827) g
 Scymnus fenderi Malkin, 1943 i c g
 Scymnus fennicus J.Sahlberg, 1886 g
 Scymnus ferrugatus (Moll, 1785) g
 Scymnus festatus Wingo, 1952 i c g
 Scymnus flagellisiphonatus (Fürsch, 1970) g
 Scymnus flavescens Casey, 1899 i c g
 Scymnus flavicollis Redtenbacher, 1843 g
 Scymnus franzi Fursch & Kreissl, 1967 g
 Scymnus fraternus (Ortega) A. Delgado i c g b
 Scymnus fraxini Mulsant, 1850 g
 Scymnus frontalis (Fabricius, 1787) g
 Scymnus fulvicollis Mulsant, 1846 g
 Scymnus fuscatus Boheman, 1859 g
 Scymnus garlandicus Casey, 1899 i c g b  (garland lady beetle)
 Scymnus gilae Casey, 1899 i c g
 Scymnus grammicus Yu, 1995 g
 Scymnus haemorrhoidalis Herbst, 1797 g
 Scymnus hatomensis Kamiya, 1965 g
 Scymnus hesperius Gordon, 1976 i c g
 Scymnus hoffmanni Weise, 1879 g
 Scymnus hoocalis Pang & Gordon, 1986 g
 Scymnus horni Gorham, 1897 i c g b
 Scymnus howdeni Gordon, 1976 i c g
 Scymnus huachuca Gordon, 1976 i c g
 Scymnus hubbardi Gordon, 1976 i c g
 Scymnus humboldti Casey, 1899 i c g
 Scymnus ignarus Gordon, 1976 i c g
 Scymnus impexus Mulsant, 1850 i c g b
 Scymnus impletus Gordon, 1976 i c g
 Scymnus inderihensis Mulsant, 1850 g
 Scymnus indianensis Weise, 1929 i c g b  (Indiana lady beetle)
 Scymnus insularis Boheman, 1859 g
 Scymnus interruptus (Goeze, 1777) g
 Scymnus iowensis Casey, 1899 i c g b  (Iowa lady beetle)
 Scymnus jacobianus Casey, 1899 i c g
 Scymnus jakowlewi Weise, 1892 g
 Scymnus kansanus Leconte, 1852 i c g b  (Kansas lady beetle)
 Scymnus klapperichi Pang & Gordon, 1986 g
 Scymnus lacustris A. Gray i c g b  (lacustrine lady beetle)
 Scymnus laetificus Weise, 1879 g
 Scymnus latemaculatus Motschulsky, 1858 g
 Scymnus leo Yang, 1978 g
 Scymnus levaillanti Mulsant, 1850 i c g
 Scymnus limbatus Stephens, 1832 g
 Scymnus limnichoides Wollaston, 1854 g
 Scymnus loewii Mulsant, 1850 i c g b  (Loew's lady beetle)
 Scymnus louisianae Günther, 1870 i c g b
 Scymnus luctuosus Casey, 1899 i c g
 Scymnus luxorensis Fuersch, 1989 g
 Scymnus magnomaculatus Fürsch, 1958 g
 Scymnus majus Gordon, 1985 i c g
 Scymnus malleatus  g
 Scymnus marginalis (Rossi, 1794) g
 Scymnus marginicollis Mannerheim, 1843 i c g b
 Scymnus margipallens (Mulsant, 1850) i c g
 Scymnus marinus (Mulsant, 1950) g
 Scymnus martini Gordon, 1976 i c g
 Scymnus mediterraneus Iablokoff-Khnzorian, 1972 g
 Scymnus mendocino Casey, 1899 i c g
 Scymnus mesasiaticus Savoyskaya, 1968 g
 Scymnus micros Fauvel, 1903 g
 Scymnus mimoides Gordon, 1976 i c g
 Scymnus mimulus Capra & Fürsch, 1967 g
 Scymnus monticola Casey, 1899 i c g
 Scymnus mormon Casey, 1899 i c g
 Scymnus muelleri Peneke, 1907 g
 Scymnus nebulosus (Linnaeus, 1758) i c g b  (nebulous lady beetle)
 Scymnus nemorivagus Wingo, 1952 i c g
 Scymnus neomexicanus Gordon, 1976 i c g
 Scymnus nevadensis Weise, 1929 i c g b  (Nevada lady beetle)
 Scymnus nigricollis Gordon, 1976 i c g
 Scymnus nigrinus Kugelann, 1794 g
 Scymnus notescens (Blackburn, 1889) i c g
 Scymnus novenus Yu, 1995 g
 Scymnus nubilus Mulsant, 1850 g
 Scymnus nugator Casey, 1899 i c g
 Scymnus nuttingi Gordon, 1976 i c g
 Scymnus ocellatus Sharp, 1885 i c g
 Scymnus oertzeni Weise, 1886 g
 Scymnus oestocraerus Pang & Huang, 1985 g
 Scymnus opaculus Horn, 1895 i c g
 Scymnus ovimaculatus Sasaji, 1968 g
 Scymnus pacificus Gilbert, 1890 i c g b
 Scymnus paganus Lewis, 1896 g
 Scymnus pallens LeConte, 1852 i c g
 Scymnus pallidulus Wollaston, 1867 g
 Scymnus pallipediformis Günther, 1958 g
 Scymnus pangi Fuersch, 1989 g
 Scymnus papago Casey, 1899 i c g
 Scymnus paracanus J. Chapin, 1973 i c g b
 Scymnus parallelicus  g
 Scymnus pauculus Gordon, 1976 i c g
 Scymnus pavesii Canepari, 1983 g
 Scymnus peninsularis Gordon, 1976 i c g
 Scymnus perdere Yang, 1978 g
 Scymnus petalinus Yu, 1995 g
 Scymnus pharaonis Motschulsky, 1851 g
 Scymnus phylloides Yu, 1995 g
 Scymnus plutonus Mulsant, 1853 g
 Scymnus posticalis Sicard, 1912 g
 Scymnus postpictus Casey, 1899 i c g
 Scymnus postpinctus (Pullus) postpinctus Casey, 1899 b  (fake-opaque ladybug)
 Scymnus pulvinatus Wingo, 1952 i c g
 Scymnus puncticollis LeConte, 1852 i c g
 Scymnus quadriguttatus Capra, 1924 g
 Scymnus quadrillum Motschulsky, 1858 g
 Scymnus quadrivittatus Mulsant, 1850 i c g
 Scymnus renoicus Casey, 1899 i c g
 Scymnus rhododendri Canepari, 1997 g
 Scymnus robustibasalis Yu, 2000 g
 Scymnus rubricaudus Boddaert, 1783 i c g b
 Scymnus rubromaculatus (Goeze, 1777) g
 Scymnus ruficeps (Ohta, 1929) g
 Scymnus rufipes (Fabricius, 1798) g
 Scymnus sacium (Roubal, 1927) g
 Scymnus schmidti Fürsch, 1958 g
 Scymnus secula Yang, 1978 g
 Scymnus securus J. Chapin, 1973 i c g b  (coastal scymnus lady)
 Scymnus semiruber (Linnaeus, 1758) i c g b
 Scymnus shirozui Kamiya g
 Scymnus silesiacus Weise, 1902 g
 Scymnus simulans Gordon, 1976 i c g
 Scymnus smetanai Canepari, 1997 g
 Scymnus socer LeConte, 1852 i c g b
 Scymnus sodalis Weise, 1923 g
 Scymnus solidus Casey, 1899 i c g
 Scymnus splendidulus Stenius, 1952 g
 Scymnus subvillosus (Goeze, 1777) i c g
 Scymnus suffrianioides J.Sahlberg, 1913 g
 Scymnus suturalis (Linnaeus, 1758) i c g b
 Scymnus syriacus Marseul, 1868 g
 Scymnus tahoensis Casey, 1899 i c g
 Scymnus takasago Kamiya g
 Scymnus tenebricus Gordon, 1976 i c g
 Scymnus tenebrosus Gilbert, 1892 i c g b
 Scymnus tenuis Yang, 1978 g
 Scymnus uncinatus Sicard, 1924 i c g
 Scymnus uncus Wingo, 1952 i c g b
 Scymnus unicolor Montrouzier g
 Scymnus utahensis Gordon, 1976 i c g
 Scymnus uteanus Casey, 1899 i c g
 Scymnus varipes Blackburn, 1896 i c g
 Scymnus vilis Weise, 1923 g
 Scymnus vividus Sharp, 1885 i c g
 Scymnus weidti Casey, 1899 i c g
 Scymnus wickhami Gordon, 1976 i c g
 Scymnus wingoi Gordon, 1976 i c g
 Scymnus yangi Yu & Pang, 1993 g
 Scymnus yemenensis Kapur, 1959 g

Data sources: i = ITIS, c = Catalogue of Life, g = GBIF, b = Bugguide.net

References

Coccinellidae